Nicolaas Johannes 'Stokkies' Hanekom (born 17 May 1989) is a South African rugby union player, who most recently played with the . His regular position is outside centre.

Career

As a pupil at Paarl Gimnasium, he started his career playing for local team  at youth level, playing for their Under-19 team in 2008 and their Under-21 team in 2009 and 2010.

In 2009, he was included in the South Africa Under-20 team for the 2009 IRB Junior World Championship.

He had a short spell for  during the 2011 Vodacom Cup tournament, but failed to make a first class appearance, despite twice being named on the bench. He was then included in the  squad for the compulsory friendlies prior to the 
2011 Currie Cup Premier Division season, but failed to break into the team.

References

1989 births
Living people
People from Cederberg Local Municipality
White South African people
South African people of Dutch descent
South African rugby union players
Golden Lions players
Lions (United Rugby Championship) players
SWD Eagles players
Rugby union centres
South Africa Under-20 international rugby union players
Alumni of Paarl Gimnasium
Southern Kings players
Rugby union players from the Western Cape